Pokémon Origins, known in Japan as , is a Japanese anime television mini series based on Nintendo's Pokémon franchise which follows the plot of Pokemon Red and Blue. Like the television series, it was not owned by Media Factory (brand company of Kadokawa Corporation). Animation is handled by Production I.G, Xebec, and OLM, Inc., and the film is split into four parts, each directed by a different director from these studios. It was broadcast on TV Tokyo on October 2, 2013, ten days before the release of the X and Y video games, and began streaming internationally on Nintendo's Pokémon TV service from November 15, 2013 to December 2, 2013. On September 14, 2016, the first episode of the series was released for free on the official Pokémon YouTube channel and was later removed in 2017.

Episode list

Notes

References

External links 
  
 

2010s television miniseries
Anime spin-offs
Anime television series based on video games
OLM, Inc.
Origins
Production I.G
Xebec (studio)